The Croatian Red Cross is the national Red Cross Society of Croatia.

The organization has over 370,000 volunteer members, as well as 550 professionals. The Red Cross has been active in the country since 1878.

External links 
Croatian Red Cross
Croatian Red Cross Lifeguards

Red Cross and Red Crescent national societies
Red Cross
1878 establishments in Croatia
Organizations established in 1878